Joseph Mkhonzana Mkhonza (born 2 September 1953) is a South African football manager.

Career
Mkhonza was the head coach of the South Africa women's national team at the 2012 Summer Olympics.

References

External links
 
 
 Joseph Mkhonza at Soccerdonna.de 

1953 births
Living people
South African soccer managers
Women's association football managers
South Africa women's national soccer team managers